Erwin Gillmeister (11 July 1907 – 26 November 1993) was a German athlete who competed mainly in the 100 metres.

Gillmeister was born in Thorn (Toruń) in West Prussia. He competed for Germany in the 1936 Summer Olympics held in Berlin, Germany in the 4 x 100 metre relay where he won the bronze medal with his teammates Wilhelm Leichum, Erich Borchmeyer and Gerd Hornberger. He died in Munich, Bavaria

References

1907 births
1993 deaths
Athletes (track and field) at the 1936 Summer Olympics
German male sprinters
Sportspeople from Toruń
People from West Prussia
Olympic bronze medalists for Germany
Olympic athletes of Germany
European Athletics Championships medalists
Medalists at the 1936 Summer Olympics
Olympic bronze medalists in athletics (track and field)